Kapurthala district is a district of Punjab state in northern India. The city of Kapurthala is the district headquarters.

Kapurthala District is one of the smallest districts of Punjab in terms of both area and population, with 815,168 people by the 2011 census. The district is divided into two noncontiguous parts, the main Kapurthala-Sultanpur Lodhi portion and the Phagwara tehsil or block.

The Kapurthala-Sultanpur Lodhi part lies between north latitude 31° 07' and 31° 22' and east longitude 75° 36'. In the north it is bound by Hoshiarpur, Gurdaspur, and Amritsar districts, in the west by the Beas River and Amritsar district, and in south by the Sutlej River, Jalandhar district, and Hoshiarpur district.

Phagwara tehsil lies between north latitude 31° 22' and east longitude 75° 40' and 75° 55'. Phagwara lies on the National Highway No 1, and the tehsil is much more industrially developed than the remainder of Kapurthala District.

The district has three subdivisions/tehsils: Kapurthala, Phagwara, and Sultanpur Lodhi. The economy of the district is still predominantly agricultural.

Demographics

According to the 2011 census Kapurthala district has a population of 815,168, roughly equal to the nation of Comoros or the US state of South Dakota. This gives it a ranking of 481st in India (out of a total of 640). Its population growth rate over the decade 2001-2011 was 8.37%. Kapurthala has a sex ratio of 912 females for every 1000 males, and a literacy rate of 80.2%. Scheduled Castes made up 33.94% of the population.

Sikhs are the majority in Kapurthala district, and dominate rural areas. Hindus are the majority in urban areas.

Language 

At the time of the 2011 census, 91.20% of the population spoke Punjabi and 7.23% Hindi as their first language.

Politics

References

External links

 
Districts of Punjab, India